Randy Reinholz (born December 11, 1961) is a Choctaw Native American director, playwright, and professor. He is the co-creator of Native Voices, a Los Angeles theater company that produces new work by indigenous playwrights  and is the director of the School of Theatre, Television, and Film at San Diego State University

Education 
Reinholz holds a Bachelor of Arts degree from William Jewell College and a Masters of Fine Arts in theatre from Cornell University.

Career 
In 1989, Reinholz played Adam Scott on the NBC soap opera Days of Our Lives.

Reinholz has directed more than 75 productions in the US, Australia, and Canada. In 1993, he and his wife, Jean Bruce Scott, co-founded Native Voices, a theatre company that produces new work by indigenous playwrights at the Autry Museum of the American West.

For 10 years, he headed acting at San Diego State University's School of Theatre, Television, and Film, becoming its director in 2007. In 2012, he was named Director of Community Engagement and Innovative Programs for the College of Professional Studies and Fine Arts at SDSU.

Reinholz's play Off the Rails, an adaptation of Shakespeare's Measure for Measure from a Native American perspective, was produced by Native Voices in 2015. In 2017, the work became the first play by a native writer to be presented by the Oregon Shakespeare Festival.

References 

Cornell University alumni
1961 births
Living people